In the study of dynamical systems the term Feigenbaum function has been used to describe two different functions introduced by the physicist Mitchell Feigenbaum:
 the solution to the Feigenbaum-Cvitanović functional equation; and
 the scaling function that described the covers of the attractor of the logistic map

Feigenbaum-Cvitanović functional equation

This functional equation arises in the study of one-dimensional maps that, as a function of a parameter, go through a period-doubling cascade.  Discovered by Mitchell Feigenbaum and Predrag Cvitanović, the equation is the mathematical expression of the universality of period doubling. It specifies a function g and a parameter  by the relation

with the initial conditions
 g(0) = 1,
 g′(0) = 0, and
 g′′(0) < 0
For a particular form of solution with a quadratic dependence of the solution
near  is one of the Feigenbaum constants.

Scaling function

The Feigenbaum scaling function provides a complete description of the attractor of the logistic map at the end of the period-doubling cascade.  The attractor is a Cantor set, and just as the middle-third Cantor set, it can be covered by a finite set of segments, all bigger than a minimal size dn.  For a fixed dn the set of segments forms a cover Δn of the attractor.  The ratio of segments from two consecutive covers, Δn and Δn+1 can be arranged to approximate a function σ, the Feigenbaum scaling function.

See also
 Logistic map
 Presentation function

Notes

Bibliography
 
 
 
 
  Bound as Order in Chaos, Proceedings of the International Conference on Order and Chaos held at the Center for Nonlinear Studies, Los Alamos, New Mexico 87545,USA 24–28 May 1982, Eds. David Campbell, Harvey Rose; North-Holland Amsterdam .
 
 
 
 
 
 
 
 

 
 
 

Chaos theory
Dynamical systems